Melusina Fay "Zina" Peirce (February 24, 1836 – April 28, 1923), born Harriet Melusina Fay in Burlington, Vermont, was an American feminist, author, teacher, music critic, organizer and activist best known for spearheading the 19th century "cooperative housekeeping" movement. Peirce believed that gender equality would only come with women's economic independence and "identified the cause of women's economic and intellectual oppression as unpaid, unspecialized domestic work." Her proposed solution to this oppression was "cooperative housekeeping," a system in which women would do domestic chores together and profit from it by requesting payment from their husbands. An important component of her plan was the spatial reorganization of neighborhoods and homes to accommodate domestic cooperation between women.

In 1869, Peirce created the Cambridge Cooperative Housekeeping Association. In addition, she was active in the Boston Woman's Education Association and the Cambridge Woman's Union and promoted the founding of Radcliffe College. Peirce was also the president of the Woman's Parliament's first convention, which met in New York in 1869.

She championed causes besides feminism as well, such as street cleaning and historic preservation, leading initiatives to address these issues. In 1887–1888, she organized the street cleaning committee of the Ladies' Health Protective Association of New York, and in 1900–1901, she organized the Women's Auxiliary to the American Scenic and Historic Preservation Society. Peirce also spearheaded "the New York Women's World Fair committee [in] 1876; the New York women's movement for cheap summer-night concerts [in] 1895; [and] the New York movement to save the Poe cottage [in] 1896; and Fraunces Tavern [in] 1897". In 1898–1899, she organized the Women's Philharmonic Society of New York.

Her writings appear in the Atlantic Monthly, the Boston Post, and the Chicago Evening Journal. She wrote Cooperative Housekeeping: How not to do it, and How to do it: A Study in Sociology (1884), Cooperative Housekeeping (1889), and New York, A Symphonic Study. She also edited Music-Study in Germany (1881), written by her sister Amy Fay.

Family, ancestry and early life 
On February 24, 1836, Peirce was born in Burlington, Vermont in her grandfather Right Reverend John Henry Hopkins's house. She was of English, French, German, and Irish background

At age four, Peirce began learning to sew, but openly expressed her distaste for it. By age eight, however, Peirce was an obedient, "dutiful and conscientious," Christian child. According to her mother, young Peirce was "above the common grade of children of her age [and] mature in Christian principle and self-government." Young Peirce was also a writer. When she was eight-years-old, Peirce wrote "On Temptation" and "On Carelessness," two personal documents decorated with ornate calligraphy that showcased her religious upbringing:

On Temptation

On Carelessness

According to her sister Amy Fay, Peirce played the melodeon, as well as hymn tunes in her father's church starting at age nine. At 19, Fay wrote to Ralph Waldo Emerson, strongly criticizing his Unitarianism.

Peirce's father was Dr. Reverend Charles Hopkins Fay (1808–1888), an Episcopal bishop from Cambridge, Massachusetts. The Reverend married twice in his lifetime, to Sophronia Adams White and to Emily Hopkins Fay. His parents were Judge Samuel Phillips Prescott and Harriet (Howard) Fay.

Peirce's mother was Emily Hopkins Fay (May 4, 1817 – September 23, 1856), whose maiden name was Charlotte C. Hopkins. Emily was born in Ligonier, Pennsylvania, but also had significant ties to Pittsburgh, Pennsylvania. One of thirteen children, she was forced by her clergyman father to quit school at fourteen. Emily would go on to become a severely overworked housewife. She died at age 39 in St. Albans, Vermont. The toil that plagued her life instilled in Peirce an ardent desire to improve the lives of housewives. Emily's parents were the Right Reverend John Henry Hopkins and Melusina (Muller) Hopkins. Right Reverend John Henry Hopkins was the first bishop of Vermont.

One of nine children, Peirce had six sisters, including Amy Fay (a pianist), Rose Emily Fay, Laura Matilda Fay, Amelia Muller Fay, Katherine Maria Fay, and Lily Valeria Fay. Her brothers were Alfred St. John Fay, Herman Theophilus Fay, and Charles Norman Fay. Peirce's predecessors included John Fay, Anne Hutchinson and Caroline Howard Gilman.

Education 
As a child, Peirce studied in schools run by her parents in the various towns she lived in, including Montpelier, Georgia; Bayou Goula and New Orleans, Louisiana; and St. Albans, Vermont. "As well as the usual reading, writing, and arithmetic, her studies included Latin, French, and drawing, and a great deal of music. She played the piano, the organ, trained choirs, and sang alto". She also taught in these schools.

Two weeks after the death of her mother in September 1856, Peirce was in contact with Ralph Waldo Emerson, who recommended that she attend the Young Ladies' School of Professor Louis Agassiz in Cambridge. In November 1859, she started school there, where she studied "science, philosophy, literature, history, and other subjects usually well outside of the educational limits for young women, even of her class". She also developed a liking for scientific thinking and was an exemplary student. Peirce graduated in the summer of 1861, when she gave the graduation speech.

Peirce would go on to consider herself a sociologist.

Later years 
Melusina Fay married Charles Sanders Peirce in the early 1860s, but separated from him in 1876 and divorced him in the early 1880s.

Following the failure of her cooperative housing experiment, Peirce continued to advocate the "cooperative housekeeping" cause, traveling to London and Berlin to meet with European champions of cooperation. Peirce was also involved in a number of talks, in which she spoke about new insights gathered during her trip abroad, as well as views on "womanhood" suffrage.

On October 4, 1876, Peirce spoke at the Fourth Woman's Congress in Philadelphia about what she had learned about cooperation in Europe. In 1880, Peirce spoke at the Illinois Social Science Association, where she advocated the creation of a "Woman's House" as an alternative to the United States Senate.

Death 
On April 28, 1923, Peirce died of chronic arthritis and valvular heart disease in her home in Watertown, Massachusetts. She was buried at Mount Auburn Cemetery in Watertown two days later.

Notes

References

External links
 

1836 births
1923 deaths
19th-century American writers
20th-century American non-fiction writers
American feminists
American music critics
American women music critics
American cooperative organizers
Writers from Burlington, Vermont
20th-century American women writers
19th-century American women writers
American women non-fiction writers